Dylan Gabriel Mika (17 April 1972 – 20 March 2018) was a New Zealand-born rugby union player who represented the national teams of both Samoa and New Zealand.

Born in Auckland, Mika was initially educated at Marcellin College, before moving to St Peter's College. He played mainly as a flanker during his career.

He played provincially for Auckland between 1994 and 2000, and for the Blues in the Super 12. He was drafted into the Chiefs in 1999. In 2000 he returned to the Blues before playing for Auckland in the National Provincial Championship. Following that season he moved to play in Japan.

He first played internationally for Samoa, playing two tests in 1994. He then stood down from international rugby for three years to enable him to play for New Zealand (the All Blacks). He played a total of seven tests and one non-international game for New Zealand—all in 1999. His first match was against his old side Samoa, who were also captained by his cousin, Pat Lam. 

He played in several of that year's Tri-Nations matches before being selected for the squad for the 1999 Rugby World Cup. In that tournament he started only one match, against Italy in Huddersfield.

Retirement and death
On his retirement from rugby he returned to New Zealand. Mika, who suffered from diabetes, died from a suspected heart attack in Auckland on 20 March 2018, aged 45.

References

Sources

1972 births
2018 deaths
People educated at St Peter's College, Auckland
New Zealand rugby union players
New Zealand international rugby union players
Samoa international rugby union players
Auckland rugby union players
Blues (Super Rugby) players
Rugby union flankers
People educated at Marcellin College, Auckland
People with diabetes